Podgorensky (masculine), Podgorenskaya (feminine), or Podgorenskoye (neuter) may refer to:
Podgorensky District, a district of Voronezh Oblast, Russia
Podgorensky (urban-type settlement), an urban locality (an urban-type settlement) in Podgorensky District of Voronezh Oblast, Russia
Podgorenskaya, a rural locality (a stanitsa) in Rostov Oblast, Russia